David Jones (7 January 1932 – September 2022) was a Welsh footballer who played as a goalkeeper. He played for Dover, Brentford, Reading, Aldershot and Dartford. Jones died in September 2022, at the age of 90.

References

1932 births
2022 deaths
Footballers from Aberdare
Welsh footballers
Association football goalkeepers
Dover F.C. players
Brentford F.C. players
Reading F.C. players
Aldershot F.C. players
Dartford F.C. players
English Football League players